Blatchington may refer to the following places in England:

East Blatchington
West Blatchington